Leptospermum multicaule, commonly known as the silver tea-tree, is a species of shrub that is endemic to south eastern Australia. It has linear, narrow elliptical or narrow egg-shaped leaves, white or pink flowers usually borne singly on short side shoots, and fruit the falls from the plant soon after the seeds are released.

Description
There are broad reddish brown bracts at the base of the flower bud but which fall off as the flower opens.

Taxonomy and naming
Leptospermum multicaule was first formally described in 1825 by Allan Cunningham in a Chapter entitled On the Botany of the Blue Mountains in Barron Field's book Geographical Memoirs on New South Wales. The type specimens were collected near Bathurst.

Distribution and habitat
Silver tea-tree grows in woodland and on dry hillsides south from the Bathurst district in New South Wales through the Australian Capital Territory to northern Victoria.

References

multicaule
Myrtales of Australia
Flora of the Australian Capital Territory
Flora of New South Wales
Flora of Victoria (Australia)
Plants described in 1825